Haywood v. Drown, 556 U.S. 729 (2009), was a United States Supreme Court case in which the Court held that a New York law preventing state trial courts from hearing claims for money damages against prison employees whether based on federal or state law violated the Supremacy Clause of the United States Constitution.

Background
The defendant in this trial, Keith Haywood, was an inmate at the Attica Correctional Facility, in Attica, New York In 2003 and 2004, Haywood was charged with multiple counts of misbehavior, including assaulting an officer, soliciting mail, and failing a drug test. After a guilty verdict, Haywood filed suit in a New York state court against two employees of the Attica Correctional facility to review the claims under 42 U.S.C. § 1983. The defendants moved to dismiss Haywood's claims based on a New York statute that banned inmates from filing suit against the "official capacities" of correctional officers of the state.

Decision of the Supreme Court
Writing for the majority in favor of Haywood, Justice Stevens wrote the opinion of the Supreme Court. The court noted that the New York statute was passed to protect correctional facilities employees against "frivolous" damages suits filed by inmates. The Court found, however, that states "may not relieve whole categories of federal claims from their courts merely to avoid congestion."

Dissenting opinions
In dissent, Justice Clarence Thomas note that "neither the Constitution nor Supreme Court precedent require that states open their courts to Section 1983 claims."

Arguments
The case was argued by Jason E. Murtagh, an attorney with Dechert, for the Petitioner, and by Barbara D. Underwood for Respondent.

See also
List of United States Supreme Court cases, volume 556
List of United States Supreme Court cases

References

External links
 

United States Supreme Court cases
2009 in United States case law
United States Supreme Court cases of the Roberts Court
Attica Correctional Facility